The Zhongxian–Wuhan Pipeline is a natural gas pipeline, which connects Sichuan and Chongqing gas fields with consumers in Hubei and Hunan provinces.

History
Preparations of the pipeline project started in 1998 and the project was fully launched in March 2001. The feasibility study was approved by the Chinese State Council on 13 November 2002. Construction of the pipeline started on 28 August 2003 and was completed on 1 July 2005.

Route
The pipeline runs from Zhong County in Chongqing to Wuhan. The trunk pipeline has three branch pipelines from Jingzhou to Xiangfan, from Qianjiang to Xiangtan and from Wuhan to Huangshi and Huaiyang connecting it with the West–East Gas Pipeline.

Technical features
It cost around 5 billion Chinese yuan.

Operator
The pipeline is operated by PetroChina.

See also

Sichuan–Shanghai gas pipeline
Shaan–Jing pipeline

References

2005 establishments in China
Buildings and structures completed in 2005
Natural gas pipelines in China
Buildings and structures in Chongqing
Economy of Chongqing
Buildings and structures in Wuhan